QuickChek is a chain of convenience stores based in Whitehouse Station, New Jersey with 153 stores in New Jersey and New York. The first store opened in Dunellen, New Jersey in 1967, and has since then grown into a chain. Several stores include pharmacies, gas stations, and liquor departments.

The size of the stores range from smaller corner-type shops to larger convenience stores. Many stores are located in urban areas and most are open 24 hours a day. Former Stores with pharmacies tended to offer a pharmacy-like selection of health products and aids. Stores have PNC Bank ATMs inside.

Initially, QuickChek stores were mini-supermarkets with mostly grocery items, snack foods, delis, candy, milk, bread, soda, medicated products, some prepackaged meats, and a small produce area. During the 1990s the stores began to offer fuel as well and gradually changed focus on snack foods, drinks, ready to eat foods, and gas stations. Still, QuickChek stores typically offer moderate amounts of basic groceries such as bread, milk, and a few grocery items, frozen dinners, as well as soft drinks, bottled water, ready to eat sandwiches, and a wide selection of snack foods. They also serve coffee, frozen beverages (Quick Freeze), and sandwiches. Some stores also serve milkshakes and frozen cappuccinos. Like most convenience stores, QuickChek sells cigarettes and other tobacco products, along with lottery tickets. Most also sell fuel as well which has become the main draw to these stores.

QuickChek also has its own assortment of baked goods. Some of the baked goods are baked fresh in the store.

QuickChek New Jersey Festival of Ballooning
QuickChek hosts an annual hot-air balloon festival in Readington, New Jersey, which runs the last weekend in July. An outdoor QuickChek is set up with an actual deli and coffee counter, and during the weekend, visitors are able to attend the various activities that go on through the festival. QuickChek's Balloon festival in 2011 featured many artists such as Meatloaf, Barenaked Ladies, and Abba in Concert.

References in pop culture
The New Jersey-based band, The Bouncing Souls, has a song written about a girl who worked in a QuickChek.

Another New Jersey-based band named The Number Twelve Looks Like You mentions QuickChek coffee in their song "The Garden's All Nighters" from the album Worse Than Alone with the line of lyrics; "Quick Chek coffee is cooling down."

Branchburg QuickChek incident
On January 26, 2010, a clerk at the QuickChek at 1296 Easton Turnpike in Branchburg, New Jersey called the police about a suspicious man in the store. The clerk said she knew the man "had something on him", but was uncertain what it was. Officers arrested Lloyd Woodson, and found in his possession and in his motel room a large weapons cache that included illegal weapons and ammunition, a detailed map of Fort Drum, and a traditional red-and-white Middle Eastern headdress. He was charged on multiple state and federal weapons charges.  Branchburg Police Chief Brian Fitzgerald later praised Quick Chek clerk Linda Yannazzno and employee Michael Murray for their alertness.

Acquisition by Murphy USA
Murphy USA, based in El Dorado, Arkansas, announced their purchase of QuickChek on December 14, 2020. The transaction was closed in January 2021.

References

External links
Official website

Readington Township, New Jersey
Companies based in Hunterdon County, New Jersey
Retail companies based in New Jersey
American companies established in 1967
Retail companies established in 1967
Economy of the Northeastern United States
Convenience stores of the United States
Gas stations in the United States
1967 establishments in New Jersey
Fast-food chains of the United States
2021 mergers and acquisitions